Teresa D. Lewis is an American translator, writer, and essayist. She is best known for her translation of French author Christine Angot's novel, Incest  which was nominated for the Best Translated Book Award. She has also translated works by Peter Handke, Walter Benjamin, Ernst Jünger, and Philippe Jaccottet. She is a recipient of fellowships from the Guggenheim Foundation, and the National Endowment for the Arts. She is a graduate of the University of Notre Dame and received the Rhodes Scholarship to the University of Oxford, New College in 1986.

Career 
Lewis is an essayist and translator. Her essays, primarily about European literature, have been published in The New Criterion, The Hudson Review, World Literature Today, The American Scholar, and Bookforum. She is an advisory editor for The Hudson Review, and is also a board member for the National Books Critics Circle. From 2014 to 2015, Lewis was the curator for the Festival Neue Literature, an American literary festival based in New York, which focuses on German-language literature from Austria, Germany, and Switzerland, in English, and consists of literary events, book readings, and panels.

Lewis translates primarily from French and German into English, and has translated works by Hans Magnus Enzensberger, Alois Hotschnig, Melinda Nadj Abonji, Julya Rabinowich, Lukas Bärfuss, Philippe Jaccottet, Jean-Luc Benoziglio, Pascal Bruckner, Maja Haderlap, Peter Handke, Christine Angot, Walter Benjamin, Ernst Jünger, and Anselm Kiefer. In 2017, she published an English translation of Christine Angot's novel, Incest. Her translation was nominated for the Best Translated Book Award. In a review in the New Yorker, critic H.C. Wilentz praised Lewis' translation, noting the challenges raised by Angot's "antagonism towards conventional syntax," which made Lewis's translation "a feat of perspicuity". In Asymptote Journal, Tsipi Keller praised Lewis' translation as well, stating that "it feels as though Angot, so very French, is speaking to us directly in English." In 2015 she received a Guggenheim Foundation Fellowship to support her translation of Swiss writer  Ludwig Hohl’s Notizen, a book consisting of Hohl's notes, journal entries, and reflections. In 2022, she has received a fellowship from the National Endowment of the Arts to translate In the Forest of the Metropoles by Karl-Markus Gauß.

Translated works 
 (2008) Peter Handke, Once Again for Thucydides (German to English, New Directions) 
 (2012) Lukas Bärfuss, One hundred days (German to English, London : Granta) 
 (2011) Alois Hotschnig, Ludwig’s Room (German to English, Seagull Books) 
 (2014) Doron Rabinovici, Elsewhere (German to English, London : Haus Publishing Ltd) 
 (2014) Melinda Nadj Abonji, Fly Away, Pigeon (German to English, Seagull Books) 
 (2015) Philippe Jaccottet, Obscurity (London ; New York ; Calcutta : Seagull Books) 
 (2015) Anselm Kiefer, Notebooks : Volume 1: 1998-1999 (German to English, Seagull Books) 
 (2016) Maja Haderlap: Angel of Oblivion (German to English, Brooklyn, NY : Archipelago Books) 
 (2017) Christine Angot, Incest (French to English, Brooklyn, NY : Archipelago Books) 
 (2017) Lutz Seiler,  Kruso (German to English, Scribe Publications) 
 (2018) Hans Magnus Enzensberger: Panopticon (Seagull Books) 
 (2018) Monique Schwitter; One another : a novel (German to English, New York, NY : Persea Books) 
 (2019) Walter Benjamin, The Storyteller Essays (German to English, New York, NY : New York Review of Books) 
 (2020) Jonas Lüscher, Kraft (German to English, New York : Farrar, Straus and Giroux) 
 (2021) Mariana Leky, What you can see from here (German to English, New York : Farrar, Straus and Giroux) 
 (2023) Ernst Jünger, On the Marble Cliffs (German to English, New York, NY: New York Review of Books)

Awards and honors 
 2009 - PEN Translation Fund Grand for translation of Alois Hotschnig's short stories
 2014 - Finalist for French-American Foundation Translation Prize, for a translation of Jean-Luc Benoziglio, Privy Portrait
 2014 - Max Geilinger Translation Award for translating Philippe Jaccottet's Obscurity 
 2015 - Austrian Cultural Forum's Translation Prize for Angel of Oblivion by Maja Haderlap
 2015 - John Simon Guggenheim Fellowship
 2015 - PEN UK Translates! Award (for Kruso)
 2015 - Fellowship from the Guggenheim Foundation for a translation of Ludwig Hohl’s Notizen
 2016 - ACFNY Translation Prize
 2017 - Jan Michalski Foundation Residency for Ludwig Hohl’s Notes
 2017 - PEN Translation Prize for a translation of Maja Haderlap's Angel of Oblivion
 2018 - Nominated for the Best Translated Book Award, for translating Christine Angot's Incest
 2019 - Schlegel-Tieck Translation Prize Runner-up for Lutz Seiler’s novel Kruso
 2020 - Finalist, French-American Foundation Translation Prize for a translation of Michel Layaz's My Mother's Tears
 2021 - PEN UK Translates! award for Anne Weber’s novel in verse Epic Annette
 2022 - Fellowship from the National Endowment for the Arts (USA) for a translation of In the Forest of the Metropoles by Karl-Markus Gauß
 2022 - Berlin Prize Fellow, American Academy in Berlin
 2022 - National Endowment of the Arts Translation Fellowship for Karl-Markus Gauß’s essays
 2022 - PEN UK Translates! award for Lutz Seiler’s novel Stern 111

References 

21st-century American translators
21st-century American women writers
21st-century American essayists
National Endowment for the Arts Fellows
Year of birth missing (living people)
Living people